The Big Performance is a CBBC reality series which sees 10 shy children, who are terrified of performing in front of the public, sing at a huge event. The first series, which started in September 2010, saw the contestants perform at Proms in the Park, while the second series which started in September 2011 is seeing the children perform at Children in Need live on 18 November 2011.

Format
The series recruits ten shy children aged 11–13 to take part in the show and improve their confidence, as well as their singing skills. These children have usually been bullied in the past. The group would take a musical tour of the country, compete for the coveted solo spot, and face increasingly difficult performance challenges until they are ready for their final big performance. In the first series, it featured the 10 kids performing in front of 40,000 at BBC's Proms in the Park, while the second series featured the kids performing at Children in Need 2011 as part of a nationwide choir. A third series had been confirmed for October 2014, however the air date was later changed to July 2014. Filming started in April and finished in early August.
There are often messages from celebrities to help the children boost their confidence and put their all in the performance, along with some advice. The series started with arguably the most famous cast, including James who really got the crowd going with his solo, a classic tune from the one and only Simon and Garfunkel. Romance, blood and tears is what prevails the series. It all kicked off in Series 2 when a love triangle was formed between three budding adolescents which later came to a terrifying end as Gareth shut down all romantic involvement before watershed on CBBC.

Episodes

Series 1: 2010

Series 2: 2011

References 

BBC Television shows